Peter Jansson (born 4 June 1955) is a Swedish bobsledder. He competed in the four man event at the 1980 Winter Olympics.

References

External links
 

1955 births
Living people
Swedish male bobsledders
Olympic bobsledders of Sweden
Bobsledders at the 1980 Winter Olympics
People from Gävle
Sportspeople from Gävleborg County
20th-century Swedish people